Deepaaradhana is a 1983 Indian Malayalam film, directed by Vijayanand and produced by T. K. Balachandran. The film stars Prem Nazir, M. G. Soman, Seema and T. G. Ravi in the lead roles. The film has musical score by A. T. Ummer.

Cast
Prem Nazir as Rahim
M. G. Soman as Damu
Seema as Vilasini
T. G. Ravi as Menon
Anuradha as Painkili/Padmaja
Nellikode Bhaskaran as Sankaran Potti
Santhakumari as Dakshyayani
Vanitha Krishnachandran as Jaanu
Krishnachandran as Vishnu
Kunchan as Vasu
Meena as Chinthamani Chellamma
Prathapachandran as Minister
Poojappura Ravi as Kuttan
V. D. Rajappan as Kittan
C. I. Paul as Muthalali

Soundtrack
The music was composed by A. T. Ummer and the lyrics were written by Poovachal Khader.

References

External links
 

1983 films
1980s Malayalam-language films